The 2003 Central American Junior and Youth Championships in Athletics were held at the Estadio Nacional in San José, Costa Rica, between September 4–6, 2003. Organized by the Central American Isthmus Athletic Confederation (CADICA), it was the 16th edition of the Junior (U-20) and the 11th edition of the Youth (U-18) competition. A total of 83 events were contested, 43 by boys and 40 by girls. The championship was held jointly with the IX Central American U-14 and U-12 Age Group Championship (Campeonato Centroamericano Infantil).

Medal summary
Complete results can be found on the CACAC and on the AthletismoCR webpage.

Junior

Boys (U-20)

Girls (U-20)

Youth

Boys (U-18)

Girls (U-18)

Medal table (unofficial)
The medal table published include the U-14 and U-12 categories of the Age
Group Championship.  The medal table below shows an unofficial medal count for the Junior
and Youth categories only.

Team trophies
The placing table for team trophy awarded to the 1st place overall team (boys and girls, including the U-14 and U-12 categories of the Age Group Championship) was published.

Overall

Participation
A total number of 503 athletes (including U-14 and U-12) was reported to
participate in the event.  An unofficial count results
in 301 athletes participating in the Junior and Youth categories.  The numbers
in brackets refer to (published total no. of athletes/unofficial count of U-20
and U-18).

 (43/20)
 (136/92)
 (86/46)
 (63/41)
 (41/20)
 (56/38)
 Panamá (78/44)

References

 
International athletics competitions hosted by Costa Rica
Central American Junior
Central American Junior
2003 in youth sport